The Battle of Leontion in 217 BC was the last battle of the Social War fought between the Achaean League and the Aetolian League. The battle is mentioned by the historian Polybius and by the Achaean poet Damagetus, who calls it the "Battle at the Achaean Trench".

Prelude
In the first years of the war the Aetolians had raided the Peloponnese on several occasions, and the Achaeans appeared incapable of defending their territory. For this reason, after the Battle of Caphyae, the Achaean leader Aratus of Sicyon had called on the Hellenic allies for help, and on the turn of 219/18 the Macedonian king responded, launching a winter offensive in Arcadia, Elis and Triphylia. On this occasion he captured the Aetolian general Euripidas.

Based in allied Elis, Euripidas had been one of the most active Aetolian generals in the war, raiding the Western Peloponnese year after year. After his seizure, the Aetolians sent Pyrrhias of Aetolia to command their forces in Elis. But the Eleans were not satisfied with their new commander, and when they heard that Euripidas had been released on parole by the Macedonians, they asked to have him back.

In the summer of 217 BC Euripidas planned to repeat his incursions of the previous years to demoralize the enemy. He therefore assembled 2000 foot and 60 horsemen, and when the Achaeans were united in assembly, he invaded the territory next to their capital Aigion. After collecting enough booty he retreated into the mountains around Leontion.

Earlier that year, however, the Achaean leader Aratus had reorganized the army, creating regional commands for quicker reaction to any local threat. Hypostrategos of the Western district was then Lycus of Pharae, who moved fast enough to block the further retreat of the Aetolians in the pass between Mount Panachaikon and Mount Erymanthos near Leontion.

Battle
The Achaeans immediately attacked with ferocious courage, killing 400 enemies and taking 200 prisoners, among them some very prominent Eleans and Aetolians listed by Polybius. Moreover, they took the enemies' weapons and the whole booty away.

After this success Lycus called the hipparch Demodocus with the Achaean cavalry and together they entered the territory of Elis, where they killed 200 more and took 80 prisoners.

The Achaean poet Damagetus seems to refer to the same battle in two of his epitaphs, where he talks of a "battle at the Achaean graben", specifying that the purpose of the encounter was to avenge the looting of Patras. The dedication is for one soldier on each side, a hot blooded Elean called Chaironides and a young Achaean ephebos called Machatas, who both fell in battle.

Aftermath
About the same time of the land battle, the Achaean navarch took 100 prisoners on the Aetolian coast and captured two large plus one smaller enemy vessel with their entire crews, and this string of success finally helped to raise the morale of the Achaeans.

The war ended the same autumn, when the Macedonian king Philip V learned about the Roman defeat by Hannibal at Lake Trasimene and decided that Italy was a worthier battleground.

Notes

References

Citations

Primary sources

Secondary sources

 Fine, John V.A.: The Background of the Social War of 220-217 B.C.  The American Journal of Philology 61 (1940):  129-165.
 Grainger, John D.: The League of the Aitolians. Leiden, The Netherlands: Brill, 1999. 244–296.
 Gruen, Erich S.: The Hellenistic World and the Coming of Rome. Berkeley, CA:  Berkeley:  University of California Press, 1984.
 Scholten, Joseph B.: The Politics of Plunder: Aitolians and Their Koinon in the Early Hellenistic Era. University of California Press, Berkeley, Los Angeles, London, 2000.
 Walbank, F.W.: Philip V of Macedon.  Hamden, CT:  Archan Books, 1967.

217 BC
Leontion
Ancient Achaea
Leontion
Leontion
3rd century BC in Greece